Quick Trigger Lee is a 1931 American pre-Code Western film. Directed by J. P. McGowan, the film stars Raymond Glenn, Caryl Lincoln, and Monte Montague. It was released on November 24, 1931.

Cast list
 Raymond Glenn as Phil "Quick Trigger" Lee (credited as Bob Custer)
 Caryl Lincoln as Rose Campbell
 Monte Montague as Sammy Wales
 Leander de Cordova as Jeremy Wales (credited as Lee De Cordova)
 Richard Carlyle as John "Dad" Saunders
 Frank Ellis as Pete
 Al Taylor

Plot
Quick Trigger Lee features a film within a film. A film crew interrupts the Wales gang before it can ambush Lee, who is on his way to help an old prospector. Lee manages to get the gang jailed while becoming romantically involved with the film company's leading lady (Campbell), and he discovers that she is the prospector's long-lost niece.

References

American Western (genre) films
1931 Western (genre) films
1931 films
American black-and-white films
1930s English-language films
Films directed by J. P. McGowan
1930s American films